Victor Alexander Vyssotsky (February 26, 1931 – December 24, 2012) was a mathematician and computer scientist. He was the technical head of the Multics project at Bell Labs and later executive director of Research in the Information Systems Division of AT&T Bell Labs. Multics, whilst not particularly commercially successful in itself, directly inspired Ken Thompson to develop Unix. Later, Vyssotsky was the founding director of Digital's Cambridge Research Lab.

In 1960, Vyssotsky co-created the BLODI Block Diagram Compiler at Bell Labs. In 1961, together with Robert Morris Sr. and Doug McIlroy, he devised the computer game Darwin (later known as Core War) on  an IBM 7090 at Bell Labs.

References

External links
 Core War at Virus Bulletin: Resources

1931 births
2012 deaths
American people of Russian descent
American computer scientists
American mathematicians
American computer programmers
Scientists at Bell Labs
Multics people